is a Japanese footballer currently playing as a midfielder for Fukushima United.

Career statistics

Club
.

Notes

References

1998 births
Living people
People from Nishinomiya
Association football people from Hyōgo Prefecture
Sanno Institute of Management alumni
Japanese footballers
Association football midfielders
J3 League players
Fukushima United FC players